BAHA, acronym for ), is a prototype of a Turkish sub-cloud autonomous vertical take-off and landing unmanned aerial vehicle devrloped by HAVELSAN for the needs of the border security forces.

The development of BAHA lasted one year at the Turkish defence industry company HAVELSAN. It was introduced at the "International Anatolian Eagle 2021 Exercie" held at the 3rd Main Jet Base Command in Konya in June-July. It can perform activities like surveillance footage (IMINT), reconnaissance, transferring and resisting radio jamming. The electrical powered version has an endurance of 2 hours, and the fuel powered version has 2.5 hours.

The BAHA is operated from a land vehicle. A further development for the central control of a swarm of 20-30 UAVs, each operated from one land vehicle, is in progress. It is expected that the development will be accomplished mid 2022.

References

Unmanned aerial vehicles of Turkey
VTOL aircraft